Moss House or Moss Hall or variations may refer to:

in England
Moss Hall, Audlem, a manor house in Cheshire, England
White Moss House, a house purchased by William Wordsworth, in Rydal, Cumbria
Soss Moss Hall, a former manor house in the parish of Nether Alderley, Cheshire, England
The Moss House, an architectural folly within Staunton Country Park, Hampshire, England
Moss House Works, a cotton or other textile mill in Salford, Greater Manchester 

in Scotland
Moss Houses, listed buildings in Livingston parish, West Lothian, Scotland
Moss House, a historic house within Kirkwood Estate, East Ayrshire, Scotland

in the United States
(by state then town or city)
J. Mora Moss House, in Mosswood Park in Oakland, California
Moss Hill, Norfolk, CT, a historic home designed by Alfredo S.G. Taylor and listed on the NRHP in Litchfield County, Connecticut
Henry Clay Moss House, Paris  IL, listed on the NRHP in Illinois
Curd-Moss House, Bowling Green, KY, listed on the NRHP in Warren County, Kentucky
Moss Side (Versailles, Kentucky), Versailles, Kentucky, listed on the NRHP in Woodford County, Kentucky
Moss Grove Plantation House, Jonesville, Louisiana, listed on the NRHP in Catahoula Parish, Louisiana 
"Endcliffe," the Frederick W. Moss house, Kennebunkport, Maine, designed by John Calvin Stevens
William Moss House, a historic house in Iron County, Michigan
Long Moss Plantation House, Canton, Mississippi, listed on the NRHP in Madison County, Mississippi
Moss Mansion, also known as Preston B. Moss House, a historic house in Billings, Montana
Bacon-Merchant-Moss House,a historic home in Lockport, Niagara County, New York
Horace O. Moss House, a historic home in New Berlin, Chenango County, New York
Moss-Johnson Farm, Hendersonville, NC, listed on the NRHP in Henderson County, North Carolina 
Follett-Moss-Moss Residences, Sandusky, Ohio, listed on the NRHP in Sandusky, Ohio
Moss-Foster House, Sandusky, OH, listed on the NRHP in Sandusky, Ohio
Cartwright-Moss House, Goodlettsville, TN, listed on the NRHP in Davidson County, Tennessee
Newsom-Moss House, Lufkin, Texas, listed on the NRHP in Angelina County, Texas
Moss Neck Manor, Rappahannock Academy, Virginia, listed on the NRHP in Caroline County, Virginia
Moss's House, an important building in Oregon Hill, a neighborhood of Richmond, Virginia

See also
The Moss-House: In Which Many of the Works of Nature Are Rendered a Source of Amusement to Children, an 1822 children's book by Agnes Strickland
Moss Jernverk, in Norway
Moss Flats Building, San Francisco, California, listed on the NRHP in San Francisco
A.B. Moss Building, Payette, Idaho, listed on the NRHP in Payette County, Idaho
Moss Ledge, Saranac Inn, New York, an Adirondack Great Camp designed by William L. Coulter
Moss Side (disambiguation)